Kothakulangara is a village in Kerala, India, situated 400 m (¼ mile) north of Angamali town on the National Highway 47, in Ernakulam District, Kerala, India. Wards No 2, 3 and 4 of Angamali Municipality are included in Kothakulangara.

Kothakulangara has a mostly Hindu population. Famous Hindu Nair Families live there. It has more than 400 houses. Most residents are related to each other. Orma Marble Palace is situated at Kothakulangara. The Canal Branch of the Chalakudy River runs through the town. The KG Hospital, one of the well known hospital in Angamaly, is situated near to this place. Don Bosco of the Salesian Fathers started a school here.  Cultural activities are being conducted annually by NSS Karayogam, one of the oldest Nair service society Branch.

The residents have formed a new association called KTN - Kothakulangara Residents Association which has evolved into a strong forum for the residents to voice their rights to the local councils, improve the civic amenities in the area and also to foster a responsible community living amongst the residents. KTN has kick started a lot of initiatives and have also formed a communication channel with the local municipal authorities to enable quick action on some of the initiatives.

Temple
Kothakulangara is famous for the Bhagavathi Temple which comes under Travencore Devaswaom Board. The wealth it possessed caused Devaswam Board upgraded this temple to a Major Temple. Bhagavathy in this temple is very powerful. The festival in this temple is in January or February. The auditorium in this temple was open for the devotees of Sabarimala on the season.

Legend

The following is a local legend.
In ancient days one Nampoothiri was carrying a Bhagavathy statue on the way to his home. Upon seeing a pond he placed the statue on the banks and began to bath in the pond. After some time he heard a sound of somebody jumping into water. The statue was missing. He realized that the Bhagavathy wanted to stay at that Place. He named the place Kotha kulam kara. Kotha is the other name of Bhagavathy, kulam is the Malayalam word for "pond" and kara is the Malayalam word for "place".

The temple also has an ancient bodhi tree, consisting of seven trees growing as one.

External links

Kothakulangara's Website

References 

Villages in Ernakulam district